Myothyriopsis picta is a species of bristle fly in the family Tachinidae.

Distribution
United States, Trinidad & Tobago, Mexico, Brazil.

References

Diptera of North America
Diptera of South America
Exoristinae
Taxa named by Frederik Maurits van der Wulp
Insects described in 1890